A bog body is a human cadaver that has been naturally mummified in a peat bog. The unifying factor of the bog bodies is that they have been found in peat and are partially preserved; however, the actual levels of preservation vary widely from perfectly preserved to mere skeletons.

Unlike most ancient human remains, bog bodies often retain their skin and internal organs due to the unusual conditions of the surrounding area. Combined, highly acidic water, low temperature, and a lack of oxygen preserve but severely tan their skin. While the skin is well-preserved, the bones are generally not, due to the dissolution of the calcium phosphate of bone by the peat's acidity. The acidic conditions of these bogs allow for the preservation of materials such as skin, hair, nails, wool and leather which all contain the protein keratin.

The oldest known bog body is the skeleton of Koelbjerg Man from Denmark, who has been dated to 8000 BCE, during the Mesolithic period. The oldest fleshed bog body is that of Cashel Man, who dates to 2000 BCE during the Bronze Age. The overwhelming majority of bog bodies – including examples such as Tollund Man, Grauballe Man and Lindow Man – date to the Iron Age and have been found in northwest Europe, particularly Denmark, Germany, the Netherlands, United Kingdom, Sweden, Poland, and Ireland. Such Iron Age bog bodies typically show a number of similarities, such as violent deaths and a lack of clothing, which has led archaeologists to believe that they were killed and deposited in the bogs as a part of a widespread cultural tradition of human sacrifice or executed as criminals. Bogs could have indeed been seen as liminal places positively connected to another world, which might welcome contaminating items otherwise dangerous to the living. More recent theories postulate that bog people were perceived as social outcasts or "witches", as legal hostages killed in anger over broken treaty arrangements, or as victims of an unusual death eventually buried in bogs according to traditional customs.

The German scientist Alfred Dieck published a catalog of more than 1,850 bog bodies that he had counted between 1939 and 1986, but most were unverified by documents or archaeological finds; and a 2002 analysis of Dieck's work by German archaeologists concluded that much of his work was unreliable.  Countering Dieck's findings of more than 1400 bog body discoveries, it seems that after a more recent study the number of bog body finds is closer to 122. The most recent bog bodies are those of soldiers killed in the wetlands of the Soviet Union during the Second World War.

Bog chemistry 
The preservation of bog bodies in peat bogs is a natural phenomenon, and not the result of human mummification processes. It is caused by the unique physical and biochemical composition of the bogs. Different types of bogs can affect the mummification process differently: raised bogs best preserve the corpses, whereas fens and transitional bogs tend to preserve harder tissues such as the skeleton rather than the soft tissue.

A limited number of bogs have the correct conditions for preservation of mammalian tissue. Most of these are located in colder climates near bodies of salt water. For example, in the area of Denmark where the Haraldskær Woman was recovered, salty air from the North Sea blows across the Jutland wetlands and provides an ideal environment for the growth of peat. As new peat replaces the old peat, the older material underneath rots and releases humic acid, also known as bog acid. The bog acids, with pH levels similar to vinegar, preserve human bodies in the same way as fruit is preserved by pickling. In addition, peat bogs form in areas lacking drainage and hence are characterized by almost completely anaerobic conditions. This environment, highly acidic and devoid of oxygen, denies the prevalent subsurface aerobic organisms any opportunity to initiate decomposition. Researchers discovered that preservation also requires that the body is placed in the bog during the winter or early spring when the water temperature is cold—i.e., less than 4 °C (40 °F). This allows bog acids to saturate the tissues before decay can begin. Bacteria are unable to grow rapidly enough for decomposition at temperatures under 4 °C.

The bog chemical environment involves a completely saturated acidic environment, where considerable concentrations of organic acids, which contribute most to the low pH of bog waters, and aldehydes are present. Layers of sphagnum, which are compacted layers of irregular mosses and other peat debris, and peat assist in preserving the cadavers by enveloping the tissue in a cold immobilizing matrix, impeding water circulation and any oxygenation. An additional feature of anaerobic preservation by acidic bogs is the ability to conserve hair, clothing and leather items. Modern experimenters have been able to mimic bog conditions in the laboratory and successfully demonstrated the preservation process, albeit over shorter time frames than the 2,500 years that Haraldskær Woman's body has survived. Most of the bog bodies discovered showed some aspects of decay or else were not properly conserved. When such specimens are exposed to the normal atmosphere, they may begin to decompose rapidly. As a result, many specimens have been effectively destroyed. As of 1979, the number of specimens that have been preserved following discovery was 53.

Historical context

Mesolithic to Bronze Age
The oldest bog body that has been identified is the Koelbjerg Man from Denmark, who has been dated to 8000 BCE, during the Mesolithic period.

Around 3900 BCE, agriculture was introduced to Denmark, either through cultural exchange or by migrating farmers, marking the beginning of the Neolithic in the region. It was during the early part of this Neolithic period that a number of human corpses that were interred in the area's peat bogs left evidence that there had been resistance to its introduction. A disproportionate number of the Early Neolithic bodies found in Danish bogs were aged between 16 and 20 at the time of their death and deposition, and suggestions have been put forward that they were either human sacrifices or criminals executed for their socially deviant behaviour. An example of a Bronze Age bog body is Cashel Man, from 2000 BCE.

Iron Age

The vast majority of the bog bodies that have been discovered date from the Iron Age, a period of time when peat bogs covered a much larger area of northern Europe. Many of these Iron Age bodies bear a number of similarities, indicating a known cultural tradition of killing and depositing these people in a certain manner. These Pre-Roman Iron Age people lived in sedentary communities, built villages and their society was hierarchical. They were agriculturalists, raising animals in captivity as well as growing crops. In some parts of northern Europe, they also fished. Although independent of the Roman Empire, which dominated southern Europe at this time, the inhabitants traded with the Romans.

For these people, the bogs held some sort of liminal significance, and indeed, they placed into them votive offerings intended for the Otherworld, often of neck-rings, wristlets or ankle-rings made of bronze or more rarely gold. The archaeologist P.V. Glob believed that these were "offerings to the gods of fertility and good fortune." It is therefore widely speculated that the Iron Age bog bodies were thrown into the bog for similar reasons, and that they were therefore examples of human sacrifice to the gods. Explicit reference to the practice of drowning slaves who had washed the cult image of Nerthus and were subsequently ritually drowned in Tacitus' Germania, suggesting that the bog bodies were sacrificial victims may be contrasted with a separate account (Germania XII), in which victims of punitive execution were pinned in bogs using hurdles.

Many bog bodies show signs of being stabbed, bludgeoned, hanged or strangled, or a combination of these methods. In some cases the individual had been beheaded. In the case of the Osterby Man found at Kohlmoor, near Osterby, Germany in 1948, the head had been deposited in the bog without its body.

Usually, the corpses were naked, sometimes with some items of clothing with them, particularly headgear. The clothing is believed to have decomposed while in the bog for so long. In a number of cases, twigs, sticks or stones were placed on top of the body, sometimes in a cross formation, and at other times, forked sticks had been driven into the peat to hold the corpse down. According to the archaeologist P.V. Glob, "this probably indicates the wish to pin the dead man firmly into the bog." Some bodies show signs of torture, such as Old Croghan Man, who had deep cuts beneath his nipples.

Some bog bodies, such as Tollund Man from Denmark, have been found with the rope used to strangle them still around their necks. Similarly to Tollund Man, Yde Girl, who was found in the Netherlands and was approximately 16 years old at her time of death, has a woolen rope with a sliding knot still tied around her neck. Yde Girl's remains showed evidence indicating that she had sustained trauma prior to her death. Aside from the rope preserved around her neck indicating strangulation, near her left clavicle there are marks indicating that she was also subjected to sharp force trauma. Yde Girl, and other bog bodies in Ireland, had the hair on one side of their heads closely cropped, although this could be due to one side of their head being exposed to oxygen for a longer period of time than the other. Some of the bog bodies seem consistently to have been members of the upper class: their fingernails are manicured, and tests on hair protein routinely record good nutrition. Strabo records that the Celts practiced auguries on the entrails of human victims: on some bog bodies, such as the Weerdinge Men found in the northern Netherlands, the entrails have been partly drawn out through incisions.

Modern techniques of forensic analysis now suggest that some injuries, such as broken bones and crushed skulls, were not the result of torture, but rather due to the weight of the bog. For example, the fractured skull of Grauballe Man was at one time thought to have been caused by a blow to the head. However, a CT scan of Grauballe Man by Danish scientists determined his skull was fractured due to pressure from the bog long after his death.

North America
A number of skeletons found in Florida have been called "bog people". These skeletons are the remains of people buried in peat between 5,000 and 8,000 years ago, during the Early and Middle Archaic period in the Americas. The peat at the Florida sites is loosely consolidated and much wetter than in European bogs. As a result, the skeletons are well preserved, but skin and most internal organs have not been preserved. An exception is that preserved brains have been found in nearly 100 skulls at Windover Archaeological Site and in one of several burials at Little Salt Spring. Textiles were also preserved with some of the burials, the oldest known textiles in Florida. A 7,000-year-old presumed peat pond burial site, the Manasota Key Offshore archaeological Site, has been found under  of water near Sarasota. Archaeologists believe that early Archaic Native Americans buried the bodies in a freshwater pond when the sea level was much lower. The peat in the ponds helped preserve the skeletons.

Discovery and archaeological investigation

Ever since the Iron Age, humans have used the bogs to harvest peat, a common fuel source. On various occasions throughout history, peat diggers have come across bog bodies. Records of such finds go back as far as the 17th century, and in 1640 a bog body was discovered at Schalkholz Fen in Holstein, Germany. This was possibly the first-ever such discovery recorded. The first more fully documented account of the discovery of a bog body was at a peat bog on Drumkeragh Mountain in County Down, Ireland; it was published by Elizabeth Rawdon, Countess of Moira, the wife of the local landowner. Such reports continued into the 18th century: for instance, a body was reportedly found on the Danish island of Fyn in 1773, whilst the Kibbelgaarn body was discovered in the Netherlands in 1791. Throughout the 18th and 19th centuries, when such bodies were discovered, they were often removed from the bogs and given a Christian burial on consecrated church ground in keeping with the religious beliefs of the community who found them, who often assumed that they were relatively modern.

With the rise of antiquarianism in the 19th century, some people began to speculate that many of the bog bodies were not recent murder victims but were ancient in origin. In 1843, at Corselitze on Falster in Denmark, a bog body unusually buried with ornaments (seven glass beads and a bronze pin) was unearthed and subsequently given a Christian burial. By order of the Crown Prince Frederick, who was an antiquarian, the body was dug up again and sent to the National Museum of Denmark. According to the archaeologist P.V. Glob, it was "he, more than anyone else, [who] helped to arouse the wide interest in Danish antiquities" such as the bog bodies.

After the Haraldskær Woman was unearthed in Denmark, she was exhibited as having been the legendary Queen Gunhild of the Early Mediaeval period. This view was disputed by the archaeologist J. J. A. Worsaae, who argued that the body was Iron Age in origin, like most bog bodies, and predated any historical persons by at least 500 years. The first bog body that was photographed was the Iron Age Rendswühren Man, discovered in 1871, at the Heidmoor Fen, near Kiel in Germany. His body was subsequently smoked as an early attempt at conservation and put on display in a museum.
With the rise of modern archaeology in the early 20th century, archeologists began to excavate and investigate bog bodies more carefully and thoroughly.

Archaeological techniques

Until the mid-20th century, it was not readily apparent at the time of discovery whether a body had been buried in a bog for years, decades, or centuries. But, modern forensic and medical technologies (such as radiocarbon dating) have been developed that allow researchers to more closely determine the age of the burial, the person's age at death, and other details. Scientists have been able to study the skin of the bog bodies, reconstruct their appearance and even determine what their last meal was from their stomach contents since peat marsh preserves soft internal tissue. Radiocarbon dating is also common as it accurately gives the date of the find, most usually from the Iron Age. For example, Tollund man of Denmark, whose remains were recovered in 1950, has undergone radiocarbon analyses that place his death date to around the 3rd or 4th century.

More modern analyses using stable isotope measurements have allowed scientists to study bone collagen collected from Tollund Man to determine his diet as being terrestrial-based. Their teeth also indicate their age at death and what type of food they ate throughout their lifetime. Dental caries, which are cavities within teeth, can direct archaeologist toward a persons diet prior to their death. Unlike erosion that the teeth may undergo due to decay, dental caries are typically sharp and well defined cavities that have a larger diameter than erosion that occurs after death. Significant rates of dental caries point to diets that are rich in carbohydrates and can lead archaeologists to differentiate between plant-based diets and protein-based diets (animal protein is non-cariogenic). Dental enamel defects known as hypoplasias can also be seen in the analysis of teeth and can point towards malnutrition as well as diseases. Ground-penetrating radar can be used in archaeological investigation to map features beneath the ground to reconstruct 3D visualizations.  For bog bodies, ground-penetrating radar can be used to detect bodies and artifacts beneath the bog surface before cutting into the peat.

Forensic facial reconstruction is one technique used in studying the bog bodies. Originally designed for identifying modern faces in crime investigations, this technique is a way of working out the facial features of a person by the shape of their skull. The face of one bog body, Yde Girl, was reconstructed in 1992 by forensic pathologist Richard Neave of Manchester University using CT scans of her head. Yde Girl and her modern reconstruction are displayed at the Drents Museum in Assen. Such reconstructions have also been made of the heads of Lindow Man (British Museum, London, United Kingdom), Grauballe Man, Girl of the Uchter Moor, Clonycavan Man, Roter Franz and Windeby I.

Notable bog bodies

Hundreds of bog bodies have been recovered and studied. The bodies have been most commonly found in the Northern European countries of Denmark, Germany, the Netherlands, Great Britain, and Ireland. In 1965, the German scientist Alfred Dieck catalogued more than 1,850 bog bodies, but later scholarship revealed that much of Dieck's work was erroneous, and an exact number of discovered bodies is unknown.

Several bog bodies are notable for the high quality of their preservation and the substantial research by archaeologists and forensic scientists.
 Cashel Man, from 2000 BCE, discovered in 2011 in County Laois, Ireland. It is the oldest fleshed bog body in the world.
 Cladh Hallan mummies, from 1600 to 1300 BCE, found on the island of South Uist, Scotland
 Girl of the Uchter Moor, from between 764 and 515 BCE, found in 2000 in Uchte, Germany
 Haraldskær Woman, from 490 BCE, found in 1835 in Jutland, Denmark
 Gallagh Man (470–120 BC), County Galway, Ireland, in 1821
 Tollund Man, from 400 BCE, found in 1950 in Jutland, Denmark
 Borremose Bodies, from 700 to 400 BCE, found in the 1940s in Himmerland, Denmark
 Clonycavan Man, from 392 to 201 BCE, found in 2003 in County Meath, Ireland
 Old Croghan Man, from 362 to 175 BCE, found in 2003 County Offaly, Ireland.
 Yde Girl, 170 BCE – 230 CE, found in 1897 near Yde, Netherlands
 Weerdinge Men, from 160 to 220 BCE, found in 1904 in Drenthe, Netherlands
 Windeby I, from 41 BCE and 118 CE, found in 1952 in Schleswig-Holstein, Germany
 Lindow Man, from 2 BCE – 119 CE, found in 1984 in Cheshire, England
 Bocksten Man, a modern body from 1290 to 1430 CE, found in 1936 in Varberg, Sweden

References

Footnotes

Bibliography

External links

 PBS, NOVA, "The Perfect Corpse" Published 1988–2011. PBS
 
 Archaeological Institute of America, 1997. Archaeology: "Bodies of the Bogs"
 
 
 
 

Archaeology of death
 
European archaeology
Germanic paganism
Mummies
Archaeology of Germany
Scandinavian archaeology
Human sacrifice